The Icicle Works (titled Icicle Works in the United States) is the eponymous debut album by The Icicle Works. The album was released in 1984 and charted at number 24 in the UK and number 40 in the US.

The original 1984 issue features different track listings and cover artwork in the UK, in the USA, and in Canada.

In 2006, Beggars Banquet Records issued both a 2-CD and a limited edition 3-CD expanded edition of The Icicle Works.  Disc 1 consists of the original album in its entirety, in the UK configuration.  Disc 2 features a selection of b-sides, radio sessions, and remixes, as well as one live track.  On the 3-CD edition, the first 10 tracks of disc 3 consist of "radio session" versions of the songs from the original UK Icicle Works album; they are presented in the original UK album sequence.  Disc 3 then concludes with a previously released b-side, and a previously unreleased album outtake.

The US version of the album has a remixed and re-titled version of "Birds Fly (Whisper to a Scream)". The US remix does not include the female spoken introduction heard on the UK mix. The US album was released by Arista Records.

Pitchfork Media described the song "Love Is a Wonderful Colour" as "one of those "wow where was this hiding?" tracks that make you think there's something left to 80s crate-digging."

Track listing
All songs on UK, US and Canadian editions written by Ian McNabb.

UK Edition
"Chop the Tree" – 4:42
"Love Is a Wonderful Colour" – 4:13
"Reaping the Rich Harvest" – 4:06
"As the Dragonfly Flies" – 3:58
"Lovers' Day" – 4:49
"In the Cauldron of Love" – 3:50
"Out of Season" – 4:46
"A Factory in the Desert" – 3:11
"Birds Fly (Whisper to a Scream)" – 3:48
"Nirvana" – 5:07

US Edition
In addition to the remix version of "Whisper to a Scream (Birds Fly)" the US album also dropped the track "Reaping The Rich Harvest" and added the track "Waterline" (USA version).

Canadian Edition
Compared to the UK version, the Canadian edition dropped the track "As The Dragonfly Flies", and added the track "Waterline" (UK single version).  It also lists the song "Reap the Rich Harvest" where other editions listed it as "Reaping the Rich Harvest"

2006 Expanded Edition
Disc 1 of the expanded editions was identical to the original UK version of the album

References

1984 debut albums
The Icicle Works albums
Albums produced by Hugh Jones (producer)
Beggars Banquet Records albums